A statue of Christopher Columbus by artist Emma Stebbins and architect Aymar Embury II, also known as the Christopher Columbus Memorial, is installed outside the New York State Supreme Court in Brooklyn’s Columbus Park, in the U.S. state of New York. The memorial is made of Italian marble and limestone. It was cast , and donated by Marshal O. Roberts.

See also

 1867 in art

References

External links
 

1867 establishments in New York (state)
1867 sculptures
Bronze sculptures in Brooklyn
Downtown Brooklyn
Limestone sculptures in the United States
Monuments and memorials in Brooklyn
Outdoor sculptures in Brooklyn
Sculptures of men in New York City
Statues in New York City
Brooklyn